In regional versions of the Hindu epic Mahabharata, Ahilawati (Ahilāvati), also known as Mauravi (Mourvi, Maurvi) and  Kamkanthika, was the wife of Ghatotkacha. 

According to a legend, Ahilawati or Mauravi was the daughter of Mura, the general of the demon Narakasura. The God Krishna, along with his wife Satyabhama, set forth to defeat Narakasura. First, Mauravi fought with Satyabhama. After Krishna killed Narakasura, he killed Maurvi's father, Mura. Mauravi decided to avenge her father's death. However, after realising the divinity of Krishna, she surrendered. Krishna consoled her by promising her that soon she would soon get married.

As per a folktale, Ahilawati was a Nāga Kanyā (Snake-maiden). She was the daughter of Vasuki, the sacred serpent of the god Shiva. As per the tale, Ahilavati had been cursed by Shiva's wife Parvati for offering stale flowers to Shiva. The curse was that she would get a mortified man as her husband. It is said that Bhima was poisoned by Shakuni and Duryodhana and thrown in a river, after which he wafted and reached Ahilyavati's kingdom. Owing to the curse, Ahilyavati soon recognised him as Vayu's son and asked her father to furnish life to him, failing which she would burn herself alive in Bhima's pyre. Vasuki gave him the elixir obtained from Shiva, after which Bhima came back to life.

It is said that Mauravi (Ahilawati) took a vow that she would only marry the man who can defeat her in intelligence and in a battle. In order to fulfil this vow, Mauravi killed many men. Upon the recommendation of Krishna, Bhima's son Ghatotkacha was asked to marry Mauravi. He defeated her in both of these tasks and married her. After this, her vow was fulfilled. According to tradition-specific legends, she bore a son called Barbarika, who is believed to have been present at the Kurukshetra War.

References 

Characters in Hindu mythology